Andrei Coubiș (born 29 September 2003) is a Romanian professional footballer who plays as a defender and captains Italian club AC Milan U19. Born in Italy to Romanian parents, he is a Romania youth international.

Early life 
Andrei Coubiș was born in Milan, Lombardy, from Romanian parents that arrived there from Suceava. He started playing football in his hometown, joining the AC Milan main academy as an under-17.

Club career 
Andrei Coubiș  entered the Primavera squad of AC Milan in 2021, a side he eventually captained.

He made his senior debut for the rossoneri during a friendly against FC Köln on the summer 2022, before figuring on the bench in the Champions League that same year, without making his official debut. He also then made headlines in the Youth League, as he scored against RB Salzburg for the opening game of the Milanisti.

International career 
Coubiș  is a youth international for Romania, as he played the European Under-19 Championship with Romania.

References 

2003 births
Living people
Italian people of Romanian descent
Italian footballers
Romanian footballers
Romania youth international footballers
Romania under-21 international footballers
Association football defenders
Footballers from Milan
A.C. Milan players
Expatriate footballers in Italy
Romanian expatriate sportspeople in Italy
Serie A players